Edmund Jennings (1626 – September 1691) was an English politician who sat in the House of Commons  at various times between 1659 and 1691.

Jennings was born at Scotton, the son of Jonathan Jennings of Ripon, West Riding of Yorkshire and was baptised at Farnham, Yorkshire on 30 November 1626. He attended schools at Silsden and Ripon in the West Riding of Yorkshire. He was admitted at Sidney Sussex College, Cambridge on 7 May 1641. He was admitted at Lincoln's Inn on 6 October 1646. 

In 1659, Jennings was elected Member of Parliament for Ripon in the Third Protectorate Parliament. In 1660, he was elected MP for Ripon in the Convention Parliament.  He was re-elected MP for Ripon in 1673 for the Cavalier Parliament and sat until 1679. He was High Sheriff of Yorkshire in 1675. He was re-elected MP for Ripon in 1685 and sat until 1687 and in 1690 and sat until 1691. 
 
Jennings died at the age of 64. 

Jennings married Margaret Barkham, daughter of Sir Edward Barkham, 1st Baronet, of South Acre and of Tottenham High Cross, Middlesex. Their third son, also Edmund and who like his father and grandfather became a lawyer, emigrated to the Virginia colony, where he served as the colony's Attorney General, as well as in both houses of the legislature, and briefly as the colony's Governor.

References

|-

1626 births
1691 deaths
Alumni of Sidney Sussex College, Cambridge
Members of Lincoln's Inn
English MPs 1659
High Sheriffs of Yorkshire
English MPs 1661–1679
English MPs 1685–1687
English MPs 1690–1695